The Tappan Zee (also Tappan Sea or Tappaan Zee) is a natural widening of the Hudson River, about  across at its widest, in southeastern New York.  It stretches about  along the boundary between Rockland and Westchester counties, downstream from Croton Point to Irvington. It derives its name from the Tappan Native American sub-tribe of the Delaware/Lenni Lenape, and the Dutch word  , meaning a sea.

Communities along the Tappan Zee include Nyack on the western side as well as  Ossining and Tarrytown on the eastern side. Today, it is crossed by the new Tappan Zee Bridge (officially the Governor Mario M. Cuomo Bridge), which opened in 2017 (north or westbound span) and 2018 (south or eastbound span) at about the same length as the old bridge.

On September 14, 1609, the explorer Henry Hudson entered the Tappan Zee while sailing upstream from New York Harbor. At first, Hudson believed the widening of the river indicated that he had found the Northwest Passage. He proceeded upstream as far as present-day Troy before concluding that no such strait existed there.

The Tappan Zee is mentioned several times in Washington Irving's famous short story, "The Legend of Sleepy Hollow." The tale is set in the vicinity of Tarrytown, in the area near Irving's own home at Sunnyside. In Frederik Pohl's 1977 Hugo award-winning novel Gateway, the main character Robinette Broadhead has "a summer apartment overlooking the Tappan Sea and The Palisades Dam." Pohl lived in the area while writing the book.  Jazz pianist Bob James named one of the tracks from his 1977 album BJ4, in addition to his record label he founded, after the Tappan Zee.

See also
 Tappan Zee Bridge (1955–2017)
 Tappan Zee Bridge (2017–present)
 Haverstraw Bay

References

External links

 Tappan Zee Bridge
 ewebtribe.com

Hudson River
Lakes of Rockland County, New York
Transportation in Westchester County, New York
Lakes of New York (state)